Mammad Hasan agha palace is a historical palace located in the historical center of Shusha city. The palace was built on a steep rock in the southeast of the Shusha plateau. The palace belonged to Mammad Hasan agha, the eldest son of Ibrahim Khalil Khan, and his family members. Agha Mohammad Shah Qajar Muhammad Hasan, who captured Shusha in 1796, began to live in the Mammad Hasan agha palace, and in 1797 he was murdered in this palace by his servant Safar Ali.

History 

Castles where the khan's palace is located are characteristic for the fortress-cities of the feudal period of Azerbaijan. These castles, which are dominant in terms of architecture and planning of new cities that were the capitals of khanates, small feudal states that began to form from the beginning of the 18th century, housed a palace complex and other auxiliary buildings to ensure the residence, safety and activities of the ruler and his family. In the 16th-18th centuries, the ruling castles in Azerbaijan were called Icheri gala, Bala gala or Ark (as in Tabriz, for example).

As the area where the Shusha fortress is located has a unique strategic feature, the construction of the castles inside the fortress, including the castle of Panah Ali Khan, was started at the same time as the construction of the Shusha fortress. According to Mirza Adigozal bey, during the reign of Panah Ali Khan, "wide buildings and tall palaces" were built for the members of the Khan family in Shusha.

According to N. Dubrovin, on the steep rock on the south-eastern side of the castle, "the square-shaped palace of Mammad Hasan agha, the son of Ibrahim Khalil Khan" was located. During the occupation of Shusha fortress in 1796–1797, Agha Mohammad Shah Qajar and his nobles settled in this palace.

In the 19th-century plans of Shusha city, including the general plan of 1837, a square-shaped building with large dimensions is shown in the place indicated by N. Dubrovin. That building is marked in the plans as "Colonel Jafargulu Aga's house". Jafargulu agha was the son and successor of Mammad Hasan agha.

Architecture 
The architectural features of the palace and the description of the bedroom used by Agha Muhammad Khan Qajar when he lived in the palace can be found in the work of N. Dubrovin. Describing the palace, he writes:

E. Avalov notes that according to the city plan of the 19th century, the inner courtyard of the palace is also square-shaped. The Prussian statesman and writer August von Haxthausen, who visited Shusha in 1843, noted that the palace did not differ much from the surrounding buildings in terms of appearance.

References

Sources 
 
 
 
 

Architecture in Azerbaijan
Palaces in Azerbaijan
Karabakh Khanate
Monuments and memorials in Shusha